Thurrock Council is the local authority for the unitary authority of Thurrock in Essex, England. Until 1 April 1998 it was a non-metropolitan district. One third of the council is elected each year, followed by one year without an election. Since the unitary authority was first elected in 1997, the council has consisted of 49 councillors elected from 20 wards.

Political control
The first election to the council was held in 1973, initially operating as a shadow authority before coming into its powers on 1 April 1974. Since 1974 political control of the council has been held by the following parties:

Non-metropolitan district

Unitary authority

Leadership
The leaders of the council since 1989 have been:

Mayors
The role of mayor is largely ceremonical in Thurrock, and is usually held by a different councillor each year. The mayors since 1982 have included:

Council elections

Non-metropolitan district elections
1973 Thurrock Borough Council election
1976 Thurrock Borough Council election
1979 Thurrock Borough Council election (New ward boundaries)
1980 Thurrock Borough Council election
1982 Thurrock Borough Council election
1983 Thurrock Borough Council election
1984 Thurrock Borough Council election
1986 Thurrock Borough Council election
1987 Thurrock Borough Council election
1988 Thurrock Borough Council election
1990 Thurrock Borough Council election
1991 Thurrock Borough Council election
1992 Thurrock Borough Council election
1994 Thurrock Borough Council election (Borough boundary changes took place but the number of seats remained the same)
1995 Thurrock Borough Council election
1996 Thurrock Borough Council election

Unitary authority elections
1997 Thurrock Council election (New ward boundaries)
1999 Thurrock Council election
2000 Thurrock Council election
2001 Thurrock Council election
2002 Thurrock Council election
2004 Thurrock Council election (New ward boundaries)
2006 Thurrock Council election
2007 Thurrock Council election
2008 Thurrock Council election
2010 Thurrock Council election
2011 Thurrock Council election
2012 Thurrock Council election
2014 Thurrock Council election
2015 Thurrock Council election
2016 Thurrock Council election
2018 Thurrock Council election
2019 Thurrock Council election
2021 Thurrock Council election
2022 Thurrock Council election

Changes between elections

By-elections 

The resignation of Kevin Wheeler (Thurrock Independent, elected UKIP) on 12 Feb 2018 triggered a by-election in South Ockendon on 22 March 2018, which the Conservatives won on a coin toss.

Changes in affiliation 
All 17 of UKIP's Thurrock councillors left the party on 27 January 2018. They now sit as the Thurrock Independents group.

References

External links
Thurrock Council
By-election results

 
Politics of Thurrock
Council elections in Essex
Unitary authority elections in England